Pierriá Henry (born January 20, 1993) is an American-born naturalized Senegalese professional basketball player for Saski Baskonia of the Spanish Liga ACB and the EuroLeague. He played college basketball for the University of North Carolina at Charlotte before playing professionally in Georgia, Germany, Israel, Spain, Turkey and Russia.

Early life and college career
Henry attended South Charleston High School in South Charleston, West Virginia, where he averaged 20 points, 12 rebounds, six assists, five steals and two blocks per game as a senior, earning All-State honors twice.

Henry played college basketball for the Charlotte 49ers, where he became the 49ers' all-time leader in assists (555) and steals (293). Henry was named two-time Conference USA All-Third and Defensive teams, Atlantic 10 Conference All-Defensive and Rookie Teams and the Great Alaska Shootout Tournament MVP.

Professional career

Vita Tbilisi / Ulm (2015–2016)
After going undrafted in the 2015 NBA draft, Henry joined the Houston Rockets for the 2015 NBA Summer League. On September 4, 2015, Henry signed with the Georgian team Vita Tbilisi for the 2015–16 season. However, on December 14, 2015, Henry parted ways with Vita Tbilisi due to financial struggles to join the German team ratiopharm Ulm for the remainder of the season. Henry helped Ulm reach the 2016 BBL Finals, where they eventually lost to Brose Bamberg.

Hapoel Eilat (2016–2017)
On August 3, 2016, Henry signed with the Israeli team Hapoel Eilat for the 2016–17 season. On June 4, 2017, Henry recorded a career-high 34 points, shooting 4-of-5 from three-point range, along with 5 assists, 5 steals and 3 rebounds in a 94–91 playoff win over Maccabi Rishon LeZion. Henry finished the season as the Israeli League second-leading player in assists with 6.1 per game, he helped Eilat reach the 2017 Israeli League Playoffs, where they eventually were eliminated by Maccabi Rishon LeZion.

Tofaş (2017–2018)

On June 21, 2017, Henry signed with the Turkish team Tofaş for the 2017–18 season. On November 15, 2017, Henry recorded a season-high 26 points, shooting 5-of-8 from three-point range, along with 7 assists and 5 steals in a 100–84 win over his former team ratiopharm Ulm.

Henry helped Tofaş reach the 2018 Turkish League Finals, where they eventually lost to Fenerbahçe. In 53 games played during the 2017–18 season (including the EuroCup and all Turkish competitions), he averaged 10.4 points, 4.1 rebounds, 5.6 assists and 1.7 steals per game, shooting 40.4 percent from three-point range.

UNICS Kazan (2018–2019)
On June 29, 2018, Henry joined the Boston Celtics for the 2018 NBA Summer League, where he averaged 10 points, 4.8 rebounds, 4.5 assists and 2.1 steals in six games played for the Celtics. On July 16, 2018, Henry signed a one-year deal with the Russian team UNICS Kazan. On December 24, 2018, Henry was named the EuroCup Regular Season MVP, averaging PIR of 19.4, which was the highest among all players whose teams reached the Top 16. On March 2, 2019, Henry tied his career-high with 34 points, while shooting 14-of-18 from the field, along with seven assists and four steals in a 98–95 loss to Astana. 

Henry helped Kazan reach the 2019 EuroCup semifinals, where they eventually lost to Valencia. On April 4, 2019, he earned a spot in the All-EuroCup Second Team.

On June 21, 2019, Henry parted ways with Kazan.

Baskonia (2019–2021)
On July 17, 2019, Henry signed a one-year deal with Spanish club Kirolbet Baskonia. He averaged 7.9 points, 3.6 rebounds and 3.4 assists per game in EuroLeague. On July 22, 2020, Henry re-signed with the team.

Fenerbahçe (2021–2022)
On June 24, 2021, Henry signed a 1+1 year deal with Turkish side Fenerbahçe.

Return to Baskonia (2022–present)
On October 12, 2022, Henry signed with the Houston Rockets. However, he was waived three days later.

On October 23, 2022, Henry signed with Saski Baskonia of the Spanish Liga ACB for a second stint.

Career statistics

EuroLeague

|-
| style="text-align:left;"| 2019–20
| style="text-align:left;" rowspan=2| Baskonia
| 25 || 18|| 24.3 || .481 || .295 || .729 || 3.6 || 3.4 || 1.6 || .0 || 7.9 || 10.4
|-
| style="text-align:left;"| 2020–21
| 34 || 17 || 26.4 || .510 || .329 || .814 || 3.2 || 7.3 || 1.7 || .1 || 10.5 || 16.0

EuroCup

|-
| style="text-align:left;"|2015–16
| style="text-align:left;"|Ulm
| 6 || 2 || 21.4 || .552 || .250 || .750 || 3.5 || 3.2 || 1.7 || .2 || 7.0 || 11.8
|-
| style="text-align:left;"|2017–18
| style="text-align:left;"|Tofaş
| 10 || 5 || 25.3 || .646 || .429 || .800 || 3.5 || 4.6 || 2.0 || .1 || 10.9 || 16.3
|-
| style="text-align:left;"|2018–19
| style="text-align:left;"|UNICS
| 21 || 19 || 26.3 || .444 || .322 || .735 || 4.0 || 5.3 || 1.5 || .1 || 10.4 || 14.0
|-

References

External links
 Charlotte 49ers bio
 RealGM profile

1993 births
Living people
American expatriate basketball people in Georgia (country)
American expatriate basketball people in Germany
American expatriate basketball people in Israel
American expatriate basketball people in Russia
American expatriate basketball people in Spain
American expatriate basketball people in Turkey
American men's basketball players
Basketball players from West Virginia
BC UNICS players
Charlotte 49ers men's basketball players
Fenerbahçe men's basketball players
Hapoel Eilat basketball players
Liga ACB players
People from South Charleston, West Virginia
Point guards
Ratiopharm Ulm players
Saski Baskonia players
Shooting guards
South Charleston High School alumni
Tofaş S.K. players